Plasminogen activator inhibitor-1 (PAI-1) also known as endothelial plasminogen activator inhibitor or serpin E1 is a protein that in humans is encoded by the SERPINE1 gene. Elevated PAI-1 is a risk factor for thrombosis and atherosclerosis

PAI-1 is a serine protease inhibitor (serpin) that functions as the principal inhibitor of tissue plasminogen activator (tPA) and urokinase (uPA), the activators of plasminogen and hence fibrinolysis (the physiological breakdown of blood clots). It is a serine protease inhibitor (serpin) protein (SERPINE1).

The other PAI, plasminogen activator inhibitor-2 (PAI-2) is secreted by the placenta and only present in significant amounts during pregnancy. In addition, protease nexin acts as an inhibitor of tPA and urokinase. PAI-1, however, is the main inhibitor of the plasminogen activators.

Genetics
The PAI-1 gene is SERPINE1, located on chromosome 7 (7q21.3-q22). There is a common polymorphism known as 4G/5G in the promoter region. The 5G allele is slightly less transcriptionally active than the 4G.

Function 

PAI-1's main function entails the inhibition of urokinase plasminogen activator (uPA), an enzyme responsible for the cleavage of plasminogen to form plasmin. Plasmin mediates the degradation of the extracellular matrix either by itself or in conjunction with matrix metalloproteinases. In this scenario, PAI-1 inhibits uPA via active site binding, preventing the formation of plasmin. Additional inhibition is mediated by PAI-1 binding to the uPA/uPA receptor complex, resulting in the latter's degradation. Thus, PAI can be said to inhibit the serine proteases tPA and uPA/urokinase, and hence is an inhibitor of fibrinolysis, the physiological process that degrades blood clots. In addition, PAI-1 inhibits the activity of matrix metalloproteinases, which play a crucial role in invasion of malignant cells through the basal lamina.

PAI-1 is mainly produced by the endothelium (cells lining blood vessels), but is also secreted by other tissue types, such as adipose tissue.

Role in disease
Congenital deficiency of PAI-1 has been reported; as fibrinolysis is not suppressed adequately, it leads to a hemorrhagic diathesis (a tendency to hemorrhage).

PAI-1 is present in increased levels in various disease states (such as a number of forms of cancer), as well as in obesity and the metabolic syndrome. It has been linked to the increased occurrence of thrombosis in patients with these conditions.

PAI-1 can induce cellular senescence. PAI-1 can also be a component of the senescence-associated secretory phenotype (SASP).

In inflammatory conditions in which fibrin is deposited in tissues, PAI-1 appears to play a significant role in the progression to fibrosis (pathological formation of connective tissue). Presumably, lower PAI levels would lead to less suppression of fibrinolysis and conversely a more rapid degradation of the fibrin.

Angiotensin II increases synthesis of plasminogen activator inhibitor-1, so it accelerates the development of atherosclerosis.

Pharmacology
 Tiplaxtinin (PAI-039) is a small molecule inhibitor that is being studied for use in the attenuation of remodeling of blood vessels, a result of arterial hypertension and activation of the renin–angiotensin system.
 Annonacinone is a naturally occurring PAI-1 inhibitor found in plants of the Annonaceae family.

Interactions 
Plasminogen activator inhibitor-1 has been shown to interact with ORM1.

References

Further reading

External links 
 The MEROPS online database for peptidases and their inhibitors: I04.020
 
 

Fibrinolytic system
Serine protease inhibitors